The Department of Computer Science at Stony Brook University in Stony Brook, New York, United States, was established in 1969. The department completed the NSF-funded Reality Deck project, a 1.5 billion pixel immersive display which is the largest resolution immersive display ever built.

References

Stony Brook University